The Bidadari Park is a wooded park located at Bidadari, bounded by Bidadari Park Drive and Upper Aljunied Road, in Singapore.

Background
The site was once part of the Malay section of the Bidadari Cemetery before exhumation took place from 2001 to 2006, which also included about 68,000 Malay graves, most of which were reburied at the Pusara Abidi Cemetery in Choa Chu Kang.

With exhumation of the cemetery having been completed by 2006, flora and fauna thrived at the site and it became a resting spot for migratory birds and endangered species, with sightings of almost 146 bird species.

In 2012, the Nature Society submitted a proposal to conserve a portion of the park for bird populations to continue to reside or nest there.

Bidadari Memorial Garden

The park is currently in integration with the nearby Bidadari Garden which was first built in 2004.

Alkaff Lake
The upcoming artificial lake known as Alkaff Lake, inspired by the long demolished Alkaff Gardens and its artificial lake, was announced in 2013 and is being constructed in the southern part of the park.

References

Parks in Singapore
Places in Singapore
Toa Payoh